The Gallery of Madame Liu-Tsong is an American television series which aired on the now defunct DuMont Television Network. It starred Chinese American silent film and talkie star Anna May Wong (birth name Wong Liu-tsong)  who played a detective in a role written specifically for her. The Gallery of Madame Liu-Tsong was the first U.S. television series starring an Asian-American series lead.

Broadcast history
Wong's character was a dealer in Chinese art whose career involved her in detective work and international intrigue. The ten half-hour episodes aired during prime time, on Wednesdays at 9:00p.m. ET. Though there were plans for a second season, DuMont canceled the show in 1952. No copies of the show or its scripts are known to exist.

Preservation status
Like most DuMont programs, no known episodes of The Gallery of Madame Liu-Tsong exist today, the majority of the network's footage having been dumped into the Hudson River upon closure. Although a few kinescope episodes of various DuMont series survive at Chicago's Museum of Broadcast Communications, New York's Paley Center for Media, and the UCLA Film and Television Archive, there are no copies of Madame Liu-Tsong in these archives.

In 1996, early television actress Edie Adams testified at a hearing in front of a panel of the Library of Congress on the preservation of American television and video. Adams stated that, by the 1970s, little value was given to the DuMont film archive, and that all the remaining kinescopes of DuMont series were loaded into three trucks and dumped into Upper New York Bay.

Episode list

See also

List of programs broadcast by the DuMont Television Network
List of surviving DuMont Television Network broadcasts
1951-52 United States network television schedule

References

Bibliography
David Weinstein, The Forgotten Network: DuMont and the Birth of American Television (Philadelphia: Temple University Press, 2004) 
Alex McNeil, Total Television, Fourth edition (New York: Penguin Books, 1980) 
Tim Brooks and Earle Marsh, The Complete Directory to Prime Time Network TV Shows, Third edition (New York: Ballantine Books, 1964)

External links
 
 DuMont historical website
 

Chinese American television
Black-and-white American television shows
DuMont Television Network original programming
1951 American television series debuts
1951 American television series endings
American detective television series